The Beacon Drive In is a restaurant in Victoria, British Columbia, Canada. Founded and built in 1958 by Bill Pistol and Bob Macmillan, it became known as a "Victoria institution" for its soft-serve ice cream, friendly service, and local clientele. Located at 126 Douglas Street, the Beacon Drive In is directly across from the 75-hectare Beacon Hill Park, which does not allow food to be sold within the park grounds — making the fast-food restaurant a destination for picnickers and park-goers. It is also just up the road from the old Beacon Lodge. The most popular item on the menu is the ice cream, which comes in a variety of dips and flavours, as it is known locally as Victoria's soft ice cream headquarters.

Part of the Beacon Drive In's appeal stems from the fact that it has been in business for more than 50 years with very few changes.  Aside from adding a few awnings, outdoor heaters, and a new colour scheme the building is still the same as it was when it was built.  Even the menu is largely unchanged, with current co-owner Peter Loubardeas boasting that "our top 10 items have been the same for, I'm going to say, the past 40 years," Loubardeas, along with his father Gus, bought the restaurant in 2005 from Jim Douglas who ran it for more than 42 years, following in the footsteps of his father, H.W. Douglas. According to Gus, and other long-time employees, much of the credit for the unchanging character of the Beacon Drive In belongs to Jim, who was driven by two mottoes — "the customer always comes first" and "we don't change."

The Beacon Drive In's mascot and logo is Beacon Bill, a stylized seagull dressed in rain gear and carrying a life preserver. Beacon Bill was conceived and illustrated by local Victoria artist Bill Hitchcox in 1978 upon the request of a local printer responsible for the menus.

References

External links
 Beacon Hill Park history

Restaurants in British Columbia
Ice cream parlors